Lisa Schwab is a German football striker, currently playing for Bayer Leverkusen in the Bundesliga. She has also played for 1.FC Saarbrücken.

As an Under-19 international she won the 2007 U-19 European Championship and a bronze medal at the 2008 U-20 World Cup.

References

1989 births
Living people
1. FC Saarbrücken (women) players
Bayer 04 Leverkusen (women) players
German women's footballers
Women's association football forwards